Bole may refer to:

Places
 Bole District, Ghana
 Bole, Ghana, town
 Bole (Ghana parliament constituency)
 Bole, Nottinghamshire, England
 Bole (Sub-City of Addis Ababa), Ethiopia
 Addis Ababa Bole International Airport, Ethiopia
 Bole, Xinjiang, China
 Bole Alashankou Airport
 Pasila, area of Helsinki in Finland called Böle in Swedish, one of the municipality's official languages
 Böle (Piteå Municipality), a locality situated in Norrbotten County, Sweden

Other uses
 An alternate name for the trunk of a tree; used in modern forestry and in archaic contexts.
 Bole (color), a reddish-brown color
Armenian bole a reddish clay material used in painting
Levant bole, similar, used in historical medicine.
 Bole language, an Afro-Asiatic language spoken in Nigeria
 Bole language (Bantu), a Bantu language in the Congo
 Bo Le, a Chinese horse physiognomer
 Bole2Harlem, an Ethiopian hip hop fusion band
 Bee bole, a cavity or alcove in a wall or other structure used for bee-keeping
 A hearth where lead was smelted on a Bole hill
 Abbreviation of "Board of Law Examiners".

See also 
 Bol (disambiguation)
 Boles (disambiguation)
 Boll (disambiguation)
 Boule (disambiguation)
 Bowl (disambiguation)